Bazidpur is a village in Samastipur district in the Bihar State of India.

References

Villages in Samastipur district